Forest Mills is an unincorporated community in Zumbrota Township, Goodhue County, Minnesota, United States.

The community is located near the junction of County 48 Boulevard and County 10 Boulevard.

The North Fork of the Zumbro River flows through the community.  Forest Mills is located within ZIP code 55992 based in Zumbrota.

References

External links
 The Story of FOREST MILLS A Midwest Milling Community, ROY W. MEYER, Minnesota History, March 1956

Unincorporated communities in Minnesota
Unincorporated communities in Goodhue County, Minnesota